Green Lake is a lake that is located east of Canada Lake, New York. Fish species present in the lake are pickerel, black bullhead, rock bass, yellow perch, and pumpkinseed sunfish. There is access by trail off Green Lake Road along the west shore. It is also accessible by a channel from Canada Lake on the southwest corner.

References

Lakes of New York (state)
Lakes of Fulton County, New York